Joseph O'Donnell (born 3 March 1961) was a Scottish footballer who played for Dumbarton and Stranraer.

References

1961 births
Scottish footballers
Dumbarton F.C. players
Stranraer F.C. players
Scottish Football League players
Living people
Association football defenders